Calvignasco is a comune (municipality) in the Metropolitan City of Milan in the Italian region Lombardy, located about  southwest of Milan.

Calvignasco borders the following municipalities: Rosate, Vernate, Bubbiano, Casorate Primo.

References

External links
 Official website

Cities and towns in Lombardy